Agriomandra ("wild pen or wild enclosure"), is an uninhabited Greek islet in the Aegean Sea. It is located off the northern coast of Crete just northeast of Pachia Ammos and west of Kavousi. Administratively it lies within the Ierapetra municipality of Lasithi.

See also
List of islands of Greece

Landforms of Lasithi
Uninhabited islands of Crete
Islands of Greece